Gesellius, Lindgren, Saarinen was a Finnish architecture firm, founded in Helsinki in 1896 by architects Herman Gesellius, Armas Lindgren and Eliel Saarinen.

They achieved international recognition with their design for the Finnish pavilion at the Paris World Expo in 1900, designed in the then prevailing Art Nouveau style. In 1901–1904 the three architects designed and built an extensive studio home for themselves and their families called Hvitträsk, in the rural community of Kirkkonummi by the  lake. In 1905 the company ceased operations and the National Museum of Finland was their last work. Its construction was monitored by Lindgren alone.

Major works

Finnish Pavilion at the Paris 1900 Exposition

Other works

References

Architecture firms of Finland